Raúl Alejandro Escajadillo Peña (born 29 September 1969), known by his stage name, Aleks Syntek, is a Mexican singer and songwriter. He has earned nine nominations for the Latin Grammy Awards, a Grammy nomination, five nominations for the MTV Latin Awards, and is the winner of three Latin Billboard awards. He has also received an Ariel award from the Cinametografia Mexican Academy for Best Film Music.

As a performer and singer Syntek has released 10 albums receiving Gold and Platinum disc awards for high sales. He has earned special awards such as "The Honor Composer Achievement Award" presented by the Univision Network by actor Edward James Olmos and also "The Music Legacy Award" presented by the North American Society of Composers SESAC. Syntek also starred and pioneered the hit show The Voice in México.

Career
After leaving the program he decided to devote himself to the world of music and began working as an assistant and programmer in music recording studios. After having participated with members of the group  to form the band  and then joining  until 1989, he formed his own group called .

Syntek is an international self-taught artist and is on the board of the "Sociedad de Autores y Compositores de México".

Syntek has shared the stage with artists such as Celia Cruz, Juanes, Gloria Estefan, Enrique Iglesias, Duran Duran, Shakira, Kylie Minogue, Miguel Bose, Juan Gabriel, Gianmarco, Noel Schajris, Armando Manzanero, Juan Luis Guerra, Plácido Domingo y La Orquesta Filarmónica de las Américas with Alondra de la Parra, Ana Torroja, Fey, Ruben Blades, Jesse y Joy, David Bisbal, Luis Fonsi, Laura Pausini, Amaia Montero. His work focuses not only on Pop and Rock, but he has also composed instrumental music for films and shorts with excellent commercial results, in 1999 he was awarded the Prize of the Mexican Academy of cinematography "Ariel" in the category "Best Original Composition for Movies" for Sexo, Pudor y Lágrimas. He has also worked for Disney Latino writing and singing his adaptation of the song composed by Randy Newman for Toy Story 3 which won the Oscar for "Best Original Composition For Movies". He performed the song  to Sesame Street worldwide through the label . In 2005 he collaborated the song  for the animated film Robots and is the Spanish voiceover for the main character "Rodney Tin" and in Despicable Me for the character Vector aside .

Syntek is the first and only  to run a disc digital release exclusively on iTunes originals.

Participation in The Voice

In the second half of 2011 Syntek participated pioneering The Voice in Mexico: La Voz alongside Lucero Hogaza León, Espinoza Paz and Alejandro Sanz. The broadcast broke box office records in the history of Mexican television. In their participation Syntek performed duets with fellow program and guest artists such as Laura Pausini, David Bisbal, Amaia Montero and the duo Jesse & Joy. The winner of his team, Oscar Garrido, reached 3rd place in the competition.

Today

Syntek was invited by Miguel Bosé to participate in his album Papitwo, presenting the theme "Duende"; as well as the singer Fey, who invited him to launch her album Primera Fila with the song "El cielo puede esperar" written by Syntek. In 2012, Syntek launched his single "La Tormenta", and shortly after he released his album Syntek + Syntek, which reintroduced Electronica and New Wave sounds, which had distinguished him at the beginning of his career. Meanwhile, the Spanish singer Malú invited him collaborate on her album, achieving Platinum Sales in Spain with the single "Sólo el amor nos salvará", which was authored by Syntek and interpreted by both during the broadcast La voz in Spain. Syntek also participated as a driver of the National Geographic show Sorprendentemente aired in Latin America.

In early 2014 he released the song "Corazones Invencibles", the first single of his latest album Romántico Desliz and part of the soundtrack of the Mexican telenovela of Televisa (2013) Lo Que La Vida Me Robó starring Angelique Boyer, Sebastian Rulli, Luis Roberto Guzman, and Daniela Castro. The song has held the number one place in charts for several weeks in the nations radio. Romántico Desliz was placed as #1 album sells in iTunes.

Teletón USA

TeletónUSA, the U.S. fundraising arm of the Teletón Foundation and focused on serving children with neuromusculosketal disabilities through comprehensive rehabilitation, inaugurated the first Children's Rehabilitation Institute of TeletónUSA (CRIT USA) in San Antonio, Texas, on October 30, 2014. Various media figures and network executives, including the President and CEO of Univision Communications Inc, attended the event. Aleks Syntek and Luis Coronel sang the U.S. National Anthem and TeletónUSA Anthem respectively during the ceremony.
 
In an interview with Univision Syntek stated: "I am very happy to be honest, I like the cause, the children are my thing and I have always said that. We have to choose a cause, and as always I chose all causes that have to do with children on the street, with diseases, or children that are handicapped."

Controversies
Throughout 2017 and 2018, Syntek became the subject of controversy as a result of his strong criticisms of reggaeton music. He has called it a "vulgar", "misogynist", "cheap" and "generic" genre which promotes "wrong values" in society, and on one occasion he stated that listening to reggaeton could induce people into committing crimes.

In early 2018, Lemon Brick, a British teenager, accused Syntek on his Instagram page of making unwelcome sexual advances towards him. After the accusation, Syntek wrote, “It was an in[n]ocent joke and I apologize.” The Mexican singer asked Brick to take the post down. “I have a family, 2 beautiful kids and a lovely wife, and you are putting us in danger,” he said. Lemon replied by further posting on his Instagram videos showing the private messages he and Syntek exchanged.

Record labels
In July 2012, after working with EMI music for 22 years, he moved to Sony Music and released his first album internationally and in over 40 countries under the name of "Syntek + Syntek" and later in 2014 released the album Romantico Desliz.

Discography

With La Gente Normal

Solo albums
Studio albums

Soundtrack albums

Live albums
 89-99 (1999)
 Mundo Live (With Ana Torroja) (2005)
 Plug & Play (2008)
 Veinte Años en Vivo (2009)
 iTunes Originals (2010)

Compilations and EP
 Sexo, pudor y lágrimas (1999)
 89-99 (2000)
 Múltiple (2003)
 40 éxitos (2007)
 20: 1989-2009 (2009)
 Celebrando la voz (2011)
 3 décadas de duetos (2012)

Collaborations
 "Microchips "Niños Eléctricos" (1988)
 "Microchips "De Película" (1989)
 "Sasha Sokol Trampas de Luz (1989)
 "Timbiriche 10 (1990)
 "Caló Lengua de Hoy (1990)
 "Caló Ponte Atento (1992)
 "Queen en español – Tributo a Queen" (1997)
 "Tributo a José José" (1998)
 "Selena Vive!" (2005)
 "Me Cuesta Tanto Olvidarte" – Ana Torroja (2006)
 "Porterhouse, Vol. 2" - Steve Porter (2007)
 "Homenaje a Pedro Infante" (2007)
 "Todos Somos Rigo Rigo Tovar" (2007)
 "Timbiriche 25 (2007)
 "Putumayo Kids Presents: Sesame Street Playground" (2008)
 "Álbum X" - Kylie Minogue "In My Arms" (2008)
 "Primera fila" – Fey "El Cielo Puede Esperar" (2012)
 "PapiTwo" – Miguel Bosé (2012)
 "Solo El Amor Nos Salvara" - Malú

Filmography
Syntek has dubbed characters in animated films, including Rodney Copperbottom in Robots and Vector in Despicable Me.

Television
 La Voz... México (Primera Temporada; 2011)... Jurado y Coach.
 A Ciencia Cierta en el Canal 11 IPN
 Chiquilladas (1982-1983)... Varios Personajes
 Mis Huéspedes (1982)
 La Carabina de Ambrosio (1982)
 Rehilete
 Intro de "La familia P. Luche"
 La Señal – Jingle para XHGC, año 1990

References

External links
 

Living people
1969 births
Mexican tenors
Singers from Yucatán (state)
People from Mérida, Yucatán
Mexican songwriters
Male songwriters
Sony Music Latin artists
Capitol Latin artists
Latin music record producers
Mexican record producers
20th-century Mexican male singers
21st-century Mexican male singers